Canthigaster jamestyleri, known as the goldface toby, is a species of marine fish in the family Tetraodontidae. It was first isolated from the southeast coast of the US, in the Atlantic Ocean.

Etymology
It is named in honor of ichthyologist James C. Tyler (b. 1935), for his help and advice to the authors, also for his numerous contributions to the study of the systematics of the plectognath fishes.

Description
It shows no dark dorsal and ventral margins on its caudal fin but does show a small dark spot on the base of its dorsal fin. It also counts with bars on the caudal fin, as well as diagonal lines on the snout, and two dark stripes on the sides of its body.

Distribution
It is found in the Western Atlantic, particularly on the southeast coast of the US and the Gulf of Mexico.

References

Further reading
Quattrini, Andrea M., et al. "Marine fishes new to continental United States waters, North Carolina, and the Gulf of Mexico." Southeastern Naturalist 3.1 (2004): 155–172.
Weaver, Douglas C., David F. Naar, and Brian T. Donahue. "Deepwater reef fishes and multibeam bathymetry of the Tortugas South Ecological Reserve, Florida Keys National Marine Sanctuary, Florida." Emerging technologies for reef fisheries research and management. NOAA Professional Paper NMFS (5). NOAA, Seattle, WA (2006): 48–68.
Hicks, David, and Carlos Cintra-Buenrostro. "ANNUAL PROGRESS REPORT FOR TEXAS CLIPPER REEF BIOLOGICAL MONITORING AND EVALUATION PROGRAM-YEAR."
Schwartz, Frank J. "Additional Fishes Inhabiting North Carolina's Estuarine and Marine Ocean Waters to 2,000+ m Depths." Journal of North Carolina Academy of Science 128.2 (2012): 33–38.

External links
FishBase

jamestyleri
Taxa named by Rodrigo Leão de Moura & 
Taxa named by Ricardo Macedo Corrêa e Castro
Fish described in 2002